The 1970 Sacramento State Hornets football team represented Sacramento State College—now known as California State University, Sacramento—as a member of the Far Western Conference (FWC) during the 1970 NCAA College Division football season. Led by tenth-year head coach Ray Clemons, Sacramento State compiled an overall record of 4–6. The Hornets were ineligible for the FWC title and their games did not count in the conference standings. The team outscored its opponents 196 to 169 for the season. The Hornets played home games at Hornet Stadium in Sacramento, California.

Schedule

References

Sacramento State
Sacramento State Hornets football seasons
Sacramento State Hornets football